The province of Prato is a province in the Tuscany region of Italy. Its capital is the city of Prato. It was formed from part of the province of Florence in 1992.

There are seven comunes (municipalities) in the province.

Notable residents
 Birthplace of footballer Paolo Rossi.
 Birthplace and current residence of olympic gymnast Jury Chechi.
 Birthplace of actor and comedian Roberto Benigni.
 Birthplace of cyclist Fiorenzo Magni.

Municipalities and population

Government

List of presidents of the province of Prato

External links

Official website 
 Events in Prato
 Statistical data
Welcome to Prato, Tuscany (Italy) Food, art, history of the province of Prato

 
P
Prato